Luis Fernando de la Peña-Auerbach known as Luis de la Peña is a Mexican physicist, born in Mexico City in 1931. He is a researcher of the Institute of Physics and professor of the Faculty of Sciences of the National Autonomous University of Mexico (UNAM) and is a member of the Science Advisory Council of the Presidency of Mexico.

He graduated from ESIME of the National Polytechnic Institute with a degree in mechanical-electrical engineering and began his professional activity as a designer of audio systems. From 1954 was professor of the ESIME and from 1958 definitively joined UNAM. He completed his PhD in 1964 under the direction of Arseny Sokolov at the Moscow State University in the Soviet Union.

He is known most for his contributions towards the field of stochastic electrodynamics (SED). In 2002 he was awarded the National Prize for Arts and Sciences in the Physics, Mathematics, and Natural Sciences category.

Selected publications

Papers

Books

References

Notes

Bibliography

External links

1931 births
Living people
Theoretical physicists
20th-century Mexican physicists
Quantum physicists
People from Mexico City
Instituto Politécnico Nacional alumni
Moscow State University alumni
Academic staff of the National Autonomous University of Mexico
National Prize for Arts and Sciences (Mexico)